The Morris station of Morris, Minnesota served the Great Northern Railway and successor Burlington Northern until 1971.  Thereafter, passenger service continued under Amtrak, but with only a single route through Morris, the Empire Builder.  After the North Coast Hiawatha, which ran on the former Northern Pacific Railway line from Minneapolis to Fargo ended service in 1979, the Empire Builder moved to that corridor.

References

External links
Morris, Minnesota – TrainWeb

Former Amtrak stations in Minnesota
Former Great Northern Railway (U.S.) stations
Railway stations closed in 1979